Bornabad (also Romanized as Bornābād) is a village in Sahra Rural District, Anabad District, Bardaskan County, Razavi Khorasan Province, Iran. At the 2006 census, its population was 93, in 28 families total.

References 

Populated places in Bardaskan County